Muhammad Naqi Butt (14 February 1919 – 1990) was a Pakistani weightlifter. He competed in the men's heavyweight event at the 1948 Summer Olympics.

References

1919 births
1990 deaths
Pakistani male weightlifters
Olympic weightlifters of Pakistan
Weightlifters at the 1948 Summer Olympics
Place of birth missing